Theodor Pištěk may refer to:

 Theodor Pištěk (actor) (1895 – 1960), Czech actor
 Theodor Pištěk (artist) (born 1932), Czech costume designer, son of the above actor